Groty (Polish for "Spearheads") is a Polish coat of arms. It was used by several szlachta (noble) families under the Polish–Lithuanian Commonwealth.

History

Blazon

Notable bearers
Notable bearers of this coat of arms have included:

Add please Gruzdys under Families for coat of arms Groty, I can't find where to edit

See also
 Polish heraldry
 Heraldry
 Coat of arms
 List of Polish nobility coats of arms

Sources 
 Dynastic Genealogy

Polish coats of arms